Hegnauer is a surname. Notable people with the surname include:

 Idy Hegnauer (1909–2006), Swiss nurse and peace activist
 John Hegnauer, American stone carver
 Ralph Hegnauer (1910–1997), Swiss peace activist, husband of Idy